E-zwich is the national switch and smart card payment system of Ghana. The system is managed by the Ghana Interbank Payment and Settlement Systems.

See also 
 Gh-link

References

Ministries and Agencies of State of Ghana
Banking in Ghana